Calosima arguta is a moth in the  family Blastobasidae. It is found in South Africa.

The length of the forewings is 6.7–7 mm. The scales on the forewings are brown or dark brown tipped with white, intermixed with pale brown scales, some tipped with white. The hindwings are pale brown, slightly darkening towards the apex.

References

Endemic moths of South Africa
Moths described in 1918
arguta
Moths of Africa